Gabriella Smith (born December 26, 1991) is an American composer from Berkeley, California.

Life
Gabriella Smith was born December 26, 1991, in Berkeley, California. As a teenager, she was very interested in biology, ecology, and conservation, and she spent five years volunteering on a songbird research project in Point Reyes, California.

Smith began learning the violin at age seven and began composing soon thereafter. Later, she was mentored by John Adams as a part of his Young Composers Program in Berkeley. She received her Bachelors of Music in composition from the Curtis Institute of Music in Philadelphia in 2013 where she studied with David Ludwig. She attended Princeton University for graduate school and has since been living in Marseille, France; Oslo, Norway; and Seattle, USA.

Smith enjoys hiking, backpacking, birding, and making underwater recordings with a hydrophone.

Performances
Smith's works have been performed by the Los Angeles Philharmonic, San Francisco Symphony, Roomful of Teeth, Eighth Blackbird, Bang on a Can All Stars, the Nashville Symphony, YMusic, Aizuri Quartet, Attacca Quartet, Dover Quartet, Cabrillo Festival Orchestra, PRISM Quartet, Cincinnati Symphony Orchestra, and others.

Her piece Tumblebird Contrails was commissioned by the Pacific Harmony Foundation and premiered in 2014 by the Cabrillo Festival Orchestra, conducted by Marin Alsop. In January 2019, the Los Angeles Philharmonic, conducted by John Adams, performed the piece as part of its centennial season.

Her string quartet Carrot Revolution was written in 2015 for the Aizuri Quartet, having been commissioned by the Barnes Foundation for their exhibition The Order of Things. In November 2019, it was performed by members of the Los Angeles Philharmonic as a part of their Green Umbrella concert series.

The Cincinnati Symphony Orchestra commissioned Gabriella Smith, as part of their 125th Anniversary season, ƒ(x) = sin²x - 1/x. It was first performed in September 2019, conducted by Eun Sun Kim. Music Program Notes, Cincinnati Symphony Orchestra, April 2021, when Carrot Revolution, adapted for string ensemble, was performed.

The Curtis Symphony Orchestra commissioned a work from Smith, set to be performed on its domestic tour in January–February 2020, culminating in a performance in Carnegie Hall, conducted by Osmo Vänskä

Smith's 2019 composition Bioluminescence Chaconne had its world premiere with the Oregon Symphony in Portland on February 8, 2020.

Her organ concerto Breathing Forests was commissioned by the Los Angeles Philharmonic for organist James McVinnie and premiered in February 2022 by LA Phil and James McVinnie, conducted by Esa-Pekka Salonen.

Awards
Smith has received a BMI Student Composer Award (2018), an ASCAP Leo Kaplan Award (2014), three ASCAP Morton Gould Young Composer Awards, and the Theodore Presser Foundation Music Award (2012). She has also won the 2015 American Modern Ensemble Composition Competition and the 2009 Pacific Musical Society Composition Competition.

Works

Orchestral
f(x) = xsin2x+x (2010)
Circadian Rhythm (2011)
Tidalwave Kitchen (2012)
Riprap (2013) for marimba and string orchestra
Tumblebird Contrails (2014)
Rust (2016)
Field Guide (2017)
Hexacorallia (2018) for string orchestra
f(x) = sin2x - 1/x (2019)
Bioluminescence Chaconne (2019)
One (2021)
Breathing Forests (2021) concerto for organ and orchestra

Chamber
Down the Foggy Ruins of Time (2009) for clarinet, violin, cello, and piano
Kisiabaton (2010) for oboe and string quartet
Children of the Fire (2012) for oboe, clarinet, violin, viola, and bass
Spring/Neap (2012) for saxophone quartet
Brandenburg Interstices (2012) for flute, two violins, viola, cello, bass, and harpsichord
Gliese 581 (2013) for guitar, clarinet, and cello
Riprap (2013) for marimba and string quartet or marimba and string orchestra
Number Nine (2013) for flute, clarinet, violin, cello, percussion, and piano
Inyo (2013) for string quartet
the tide is in our veins (2015) for flute, clarinet, electric guitar, bass, and piano
Forgotten Lullabies (2015) for voice, alto saxophone, violin, cello, drum set, and bass
Máncora to Huaraz (2015) for piano four-hands
Carrot Revolution (2015) for string quartet
Panitao (2016) for clarinet, electric guitar, cello, bass, piano, percussion, and field recording
Maré (2017) for flute, clarinet, trumpet, violin, viola, and cello
Loop the Fractal Hold of Rain (2017) for two guitars
tapin~ 517 / tapout~ (2017) for five violins
Divertimento (2018) for violin, cello, bass
Tessellations (2018) for flute, clarinet, trumpet, violin, viola, cello
Requiem (2018) for 8 voices and string quartet
Anthozoa (2018) for violin, cello, piano, and percussion
Divisible (2019) for flute, clarinet, violin, cello, piano, and percussion
Porcupine Wash (2019) for string quartet

Solo
the heaventree of stars hung with humid nightblue fruit (2013) for solo guitar
Lost Coast Loops (2014) for cello and live-looping electronics
I heard the summer dust crying to be born (2015) for solo drum set
Imaginary Pancake (2020) for solo piano
bare (2020) for solo cello

Vocal
Maha (2014) for 16 voices
Requiem (2018) for 8 voices and string quartet

Recordings
In 2021, her debut album Lost Coast in collaboration with cellist Gabriel Cabezas was released on the Icelandic record label Bedroom Community, produced by violist Nadia Sirota and recorded at Greenhouse Studios in Reykjavík in 2019.

 2016 PRISM Quartet: The Curtis Project—XAS Records, featuring Spring/Neap
 2018 Aizuri Quartet: Blueprinting—New Amsterdam Records, featuring Carrot Revolution
 2018 Duo Noire: Night Triptych—New Focus Recordings, featuring Loop the Fractal Hold of Rain
 2020 yMusic: Ecstatic Science—New Amsterdam Records, featuring Tessellations and Maré
 2021 Matt Haimovitz: Primavera I: The Wind, featuring bare
 2021 Lost Coast—Bedroom Community

External Links
 Gabriella Smith, official website

References

Living people
1991 births
American classical composers
American women classical composers
Curtis Institute of Music alumni
21st-century classical composers
Musicians from Berkeley, California
Classical musicians from California
21st-century American composers
21st-century American women
American folk musicians
American experimental musicians
American electronic musicians
American composers